
Year 216 BC was a year of the pre-Julian Roman calendar. At the time it was known as the Year of the Consulship of Varro and Paullus (or, less frequently, year 538 Ab urbe condita). The denomination 216 BC for this year has been used since the early medieval period, when the Anno Domini calendar era became the prevalent method in Europe for naming years.

Events 
 By place 

 Roman Republic 
 The Carthaginian general, Hannibal, moves his forces southward through Italy and seizes the large army supply depot at Cannae on the Aufidus River.
 August 2 – The Battle of Cannae (east of Naples) ends in victory for Hannibal whose 50,000-man army defeats a Roman force of 86,000 led by consuls Lucius Aemilius Paullus (who is killed in the battle) and Gaius Terentius Varro. Some 48,200 Roman troops are killed, making this perhaps the deadliest one-day battle in all history.
 A loan of money and supplies for the Roman army in Sicily is sought and obtained from Hiero II of Syracuse.
 The Roman historian Quintus Fabius Pictor is sent to Delphi in Greece to consult the Oracle for advice about what Rome should do after its defeat in the Battle of Cannae.
 Following Hannibal's victory, many regions begin to defect from Rome, while others are conquered by Hannibal's forces. In Apulia, Lucania, Samnium and in Bruttium, Hannibal finds many supporters.
 The city of Capua switches sides to join Hannibal and the Carthaginian army winters there.
 After the defeat at Cannae, Roman general, Marcus Claudius Marcellus, commands the remnants of the Roman army at Canusium and saves the city of Nola and southern Campania from occupation by Hannibal.
 A Roman force of 25,000 led by Lucius Postumius Albinus is ambushed by Gauls near Litana and almost completely wiped out.

 Spain 
 Hasdrubal is ordered by the Carthaginian government to march to Italy.
 Roman forces in Spain led by Gnaeus Cornelius Scipio Calvus and Publius Cornelius Scipio successfully thwart Hasdrubal's attempt to march to Italy.

 Syracuse 
 The Carthaginian fleet ravages the territory of The Kingdom of Syracuse.

 Greece 
 Philip V of Macedon, still resenting Rome's interference in Illyrian politics, seizes his opportunity to invade Illyria. Ambassadors from Philip V visit Hannibal at his headquarters in Italy. These actions mark the beginning of the First Macedonian War between Rome and Macedonia.

 Egypt 
 A revolt of the Egyptian peasants is put down by Ptolemy IV.

Births 
 Liu Pi, Chinese prince and general of the Han Dynasty (d. 154 BC)

Deaths 
 August 2
 Lucius Aemilius Paullus, Roman consul and general (killed in the Battle of Cannae)
 Gnaeus Servilius Geminus, Roman consul 217 BC (killed in the Battle of Cannae)
 Marcus Minucius Rufus, Roman consul 221 BC, Master of the Horse 217 BC (killed in the Battle of Cannae)
 Gelo, son of Hiero II
 Marcus Aemilius Lepidus, Roman consul 232 BC and priest (augur)

References